Badème is a village in the rural community of Nyassia, Nyassia Arrondissement, Ziguinchor Department in the Ziguinchor Region of south-west Senegal, near the border with Guinée-Bissau.

Nearby villages include Bassèré, Kadiene, Goudoume, Atoure, Toubacouta, Babonda, Djililo and Bagame.

According to PEPAM (Programme d'eau potable et d'assainissement du Millénaire), Badème has a population of 646 people living in 90 houses.

Bibliography
 Kalilou Diatta, La dynamique de l’espace rural dans la vallée de Nyassia : le terroir de Badème Basse-Casamance, Dakar, Université de Dakar, 1983, 95 p. (Mémoire de Maîtrise)

References

External links
 Bademe at PEPAM

Populated places in the Ziguinchor Department